Robert Murphy (born April 7, 1969) is a Canadian former professional ice hockey player. Murphy played parts of seven seasons in the National Hockey League (NHL) between 1987 and 1994 with the Vancouver Canucks, Ottawa Senators, and Los Angeles Kings. Selected by the Canucks in the 1987 NHL Entry Draft, Murphy turned professional in 1988 and spent the next five seasons playing for the Canucks and their minor International Hockey League (IHL) affiliate. He followed that by stints with the Senators and Kings, going between the NHL and IHL until moving to the Deutsche Eishockey Liga in Germany in 1997, playing the last six years of his career there.

Playing career
Murphy played his junior hockey for the Laval Titan of the QMJHL, and was the top pick of the Vancouver Canucks (24th overall) in the 1987 NHL Entry Draft. A strapping 6'3" center with toughness and a decent scoring touch, Murphy was held in very high regard by Canuck management who felt he could be the team's answer to Joel Otto, the star defensive center for the rival Calgary Flames. Murphy made his NHL debut at the age of just 18 in the 1987–88 campaign, appearing in 5 games for the Canucks, and appeared in 8 more contests the following year while still playing junior. In 1989, he was selected to represent Canada at the World Junior Championships, where the team finished 4th.

In 1989–90, Murphy was named the IHL Rookie of the Year after scoring 71 points in 64 games for the Milwaukee Admirals, and scored his first NHL goal in a 12-game stint in Vancouver. The following season, he appeared in 42 games for the Canucks, notching 5 goals and an assist for 6 points. However, by this point the club was becoming frustrated with his slow development. In 1991–92, Murphy found himself back in the minors full-time, appearing in only 6 games for Vancouver.

Exposed in the 1992 NHL Expansion Draft, Murphy was claimed by the Ottawa Senators. As a member of the inaugural Senators squad, he set career highs by appearing in 44 games and recording 10 points, but again could not establish himself as an NHL regular. Released by Ottawa, he signed as a free agent with the Los Angeles Kings, where he would play his final 8 NHL games in the 1993–94 season.

After leaving the Los Angeles organization, Murphy spent two seasons with the Fort Wayne Komets of the IHL before moving to Germany in 1997 to sign for SB Rosenheim of the DEL. He would spend six seasons in Germany, the last three with the Hannover Scorpions, before retiring in 2003.

In his career, Murphy appeared in 125 NHL games, recording 9 goals and 12 assists for 21 points, along with 152 penalty minutes.

Career statistics

Regular season and playoffs

International

References

External links
 

1969 births
Living people
Anglophone Quebec people
Arizona Coyotes scouts
Buffalo Sabres scouts
Canadian ice hockey centres
Drummondville Voltigeurs players
Eisbären Berlin players
EV Landshut players
Fort Wayne Komets players
Hannover Scorpions players
Ice hockey people from Gatineau
Laval Titan players
Los Angeles Kings players
Milwaukee Admirals (IHL) players
New Haven Senators players
Ottawa Senators players
Ottawa Senators scouts
Phoenix Roadrunners (IHL) players
Starbulls Rosenheim players
Vancouver Canucks draft picks
Vancouver Canucks players